The Kirche Zur Heiligsten Dreifaltigkeit in Vienna, better known as the Wotruba Church, is located on the Sankt Georgenberg in Mauer (corner of Rysergasse and Georgsgasse) in Liesing, the 23rd District of Vienna. It was built between August 1974 and October 1976 on the basis of a model by Fritz Wotruba.

Wotruba died before the completion of the church, which was inspired by a visit to Chartres Cathedral.  To Wotruba, Chartres represented the essence of Europe, and Wotruba subsequently held up Chartres as a yardstick to his own work.  Wotruba was first and foremost a sculptor, and the church was a collaboration with Fritz G. Mayr, who continued the work after Wotruba's death.

The building consists of 152 asymmetrically arranged concrete blocks of a size between 0.84 m3 to 64 m3, weighing from 1.8 to 141 tons; the highest block measures 13.10m. The church, which borders the Wienerwald, is 30 m long, 22 m wide, and 15.5 m high.  The unusual design created some local resistance.

During the Third Reich, the site where the church is located housed German Wehrmacht barracks.

See also 
 Brutalism

External links 

 Official church website
 Information about the building at emporis.com

Buildings and structures in Liesing
Roman Catholic churches completed in 1976
Roman Catholic church buildings in the Vicariate of Vienna City
20th-century Roman Catholic church buildings in Austria
1976 establishments in Austria
Brutalist architecture